Forty Years Old (also known as Love at 40) is an Iranian 2010 film by Alireza Raisian

. The script was written by Mostafa Rastegari, and the film was lensed by Mahmoud Kalari. Leila Hatami, Farzan Athari, Ezzatolah Entezami and Mohammad Reza Forutan starred in the principal roles.

Raisian nominated for Crystal Simorgh for Best Film and Crystal Simorgh for Best Director, and Rastegari won the Crystal Simorgh for Best Adapted Screenplay for his script at the 28th Fajr Film Festival.

References

External links
 

Iranian drama films
2010 films